Hanni Woodbury is a German-American linguist and anthropologist who specializes in Onondaga and other Iroquoian languages. She was born in Hamburg and moved with her family to the United States after World War II. She has done fieldwork on Onondaga for more than three decades. Her Onondaga–English dictionary—the first dictionary of Onondaga—was described as "monumental". She was awarded one of the Mary Haas Awards in 1994 from the Society for the Study of the Indigenous Languages of the Americas for her work on Onondaga ceremonies.

Works

References

German emigrants to the United States
People from Hamburg
Linguists from Germany
Linguists from the United States
Women linguists
Onondaga
German anthropologists
Linguists of Iroquoian languages
American anthropologists
German women anthropologists
American women anthropologists
Year of birth missing (living people)
Living people
20th-century births
21st-century American women